Senator Garcia may refer to:

Alex P. Garcia (1929–1999), California State Senate
Jorge Luis Garcia (1953–2010), Arizona State Senate
Leroy Garcia (fl. 2000s–2020s), Colorado State Senate
Mary Jane Garcia (born 1936), New Mexico State Senate
Robert Garcia (New York politician) (1933–2017), New York State Senate
Sylvia Garcia (born 1950), Texas State Senate
Valde Garcia (born 1958), Michigan State Senate
Fernando Martín García (fl. 1980s–2000s), Senate of Puerto Rico
Jesús "Chuy" García (born 1956), Illinois State Senate
René García (born 1974), Florida State Senate
Rudy García (Florida politician) (born 1963), Florida State Senate